The World Figure Skating Championships is an annual figure skating competition sanctioned by the International Skating Union in which figure skaters compete for the title of World Champion.

Men's competitions took place on 7–8 February in Stockholm, Sweden. Ladies' competitions took place on 23–24 January in Budapest, Austria-Hungary. Lily Kronberger was the only competitor. Pairs' competition took place on 8 February in Stockholm, Sweden.

Results

Men

Judges:
 G. Helfrich 
 Rudolf Sundgrén 
 O. C. Thorstensen 
 Edward Hörle 
 O. Sampe

Ladies

Judges:
 C. Fillunger 
 G. Helfrich 
 Edward Hörle 
 Ludwig Niedermeyer 
 Oskar Uhlig

Pairs

Judges:
 G. Helfrich  German Empire
 Rudolf Sundgrén 
 O. C. Thorstensen 
 August Anderberg 
 Otto Petterson 

O. C. Thorstensen voted the top two couples exactly the same (each 1.5 placings) and the other three couples also exactly the same (each 4 placings).

Sources
 Result List provided by the ISU
 01.011909 Suomen Urheilulehti no 4 (page 153)

World Figure Skating Championships
World Figure Skating Championships, 1909
Figure skating in Sweden
Figure skating in Austria-Hungary
International figure skating competitions hosted by Sweden
International figure skating competitions hosted by Austria-Hungary
1909 in Hungary
International sports competitions in Budapest
1900s in Budapest
1909 in Swedish sport
International sports competitions in Stockholm
1900s in Stockholm
February 1909 sports events